Koord may be:
 an abbreviation for botanist Sijfert Hendrik Koorders (wikispecies)
 an obsolete spelling of Kurd

See also 
 Kūrd
 Coord